Cape May Airport or Cape May County Airport  is a public use airport in Lower Township, Cape May County, New Jersey, United States. Owned by the Delaware River and Bay Authority, the airport is four nautical miles (7 km) northwest of the central business district of Wildwood.

It is in Lower Township, the airport is located near the Rio Grande census-designated place, which is mostly in Middle Township and partly in Lower Township. The airport has an Erma address but is not in the CDP. In some documents it is called Wildwood Airport.

This airport is included in the National Plan of Integrated Airport Systems for 2011–2015, which categorized it as a general aviation facility.

Hangar #1 contains the Naval Air Station Wildwood Aviation Museum, whose collection focuses on World War II, named after the former Naval Air Station Wildwood.

History 

The airport started in 1941 as NAS Rio Grande, named for its location near Rio Grande, New Jersey. Due to confusion with Rio Grande, Texas, the name was changed to NAS Wildwood in 1943. Following the end of World War II, Naval Air Station Wildwood was deemed excess to U.S. Navy requirements.  It was subsequently deeded to the local government for transition to a civilian airport which is still in operation today as Cape May County Airport.

Facilities and aircraft 
Cape May County Airport covers an area of 996 acres (403 ha) at an elevation of 21 feet (6 m) above mean sea level. It has two runways with asphalt surfaces: 1/19 is 5,252 by 150 feet (1,601 x 46 m) and 10/28 is 4,998 by 150 feet (1,523 x 46 m).

For the 12-month period ending November 1, 2010, the airport had 30,200 aircraft operations, an average of 82 per day: 99% general aviation and 1% military.
At that time there were 48 aircraft based at this airport: 90% single-engine, 8% multi-engine, and 2% jet.

FlightLevel Aviation is the current fixed-base operator (FBO) on the field serving general aviation traffic. FBO services include full and self-serve 100LL Avgas, and full-service Jet A fuel.

On-field services include Flight Deck Diner and Kindle Car Rental. Locations off-field include Cape May National Golf Course (2 miles), Lobster House Restaurant (3 miles) and the Wetlands Institute (10 miles).

Incidents 
On December 12, 1976, an Atlantic City Airlines De Havilland Canada DHC-6 Twin Otter operating as Allegheny Commuter Flight 977 crashed short of the runway. Of the two crew members, one died and one sustained serious injuries. Of the passengers, two died and six sustained serious injuries. One seriously injured passenger died one month after the accident, but was counted as a survivor by the National Transportation Safety Board report, because it defined fatalities as individuals who died within seven days of the accident.

On August 27, 1993, F-16A 82-0990 (call sign MAPLE 91) of the 134th FS, 158th FW, Vermont Air National Guard, USAF was written off when it Crash landed and skidded off runway at the Cape May County Airport. The pilot ejected and landed in a drainage ditch

According to the following extract (albeit redacted/censored) from the official USAF inquiry into the incident:

"On 27 August 1993, (MP) was scheduled as flight lead of a two-ship cross country flight from
Burlington IAP, VT to Langley AFB, VA. The flight was to-include air-to-air refuelling followed by
Dissimilar Air Combat Tactics (DACT) with F-15 Eagles and landing at the unit's Alert Detachment
Base.

The flight departed Burlington IAP, VT at 08:58 local EDT with the call sign of Maple 91. Refuelling
with a KC-135 Tanker and DACT with F-15's in MOA (Military Operating Area) W-105 was as
scheduled.

During the recovery to Langley AFB, VA, a descent was accomplished from FL 410 to FL 310. Upon
levelling out at FL 310 and advancing the throttle the Mishap Pilot (MP) experienced a compressor
stall. The MP turned west toward land and accomplished a Unified Fuel Control (UFC) airstart which
was successful and gave him idle thrust at 20,000 ft. When the MP again moved the throttle, a
second stall occurred passing 17,000 ft. Another UFC air start was accomplished giving the (MP) idle
thrust.

The MP concentrated on flying a Simulated Flame out Approach (SFO) into Cape May County Airport,
NJ. The SFO was flown with touchdown at 200 knots IAS, 500 feet from the approach end of runway
01. The total length of the runway is 4,998 feet and the MP was unable to stop the aircraft and
initiated a successful ejection prior to the aircraft leaving the paved surface of the runway.

The aircraft continued straight ahead, proceeded across a road, and came to rest in an abandoned
landfill approximately 950 feet from the departure end of the runway. The aircraft was destroyed
by breakup and post-crash fire".

Note that, as the report is redacted/censored, the pilot involved is not named, and is only referred to as "MP" = "Mishap Pilot".

See also 
 National Register of Historic Places listings in Cape May County, New Jersey
 List of airports in New Jersey

References

External links 

 Cape May Airport, official site
 FlightLevel Aviation, FBO website
 Aerial image as of March 1991 from USGS The National Map
 Aviation photos of Cape May-Wildwood County Airport at jetphotos.net
 

Airports in New Jersey
Transportation buildings and structures in Cape May County, New Jersey
Delaware River and Bay Authority facilities
National Register of Historic Places in Cape May County, New Jersey
Airports on the National Register of Historic Places
Transportation buildings and structures on the National Register of Historic Places in New Jersey
Lower Township, New Jersey